taff (acronym for "täglich, aktuell, frisch, frech" which roughly translates as "daily, current, fresh, cheeky") is a German tabloid television programme. It airs from 17:00 (5:00 pm) to 18:00 (6:00 pm) on ProSieben.

History
The first edition was transmitted under the name taff. (with a dot) on 29 May 1995.

Hosts

References

External links

 Official website
 
 taff's channel on YouTube

German-language television shows
1995 German television series debuts
1990s German television series
2000s German television series
2010s German television series
2020s German television series